Miloš Dabić (born 14 November 1969) is a Serbian former footballer who played as a striker.

Career
After starting out at Radnički Kragujevac, Dabić played for Spartak Subotica in the 1990–91 Yugoslav First League (scoring one goal in 20 appearances), but moved to Rad during the season (7 games played). He recorded another 19 appearances and scored two goals for Rad in the 1991–92 Yugoslav First League, before moving abroad. Subsequently, Dabić spent over a decade playing in Greece for Pannafpliakos, Athinaikos, Trikala, Lykoi, Kavala, Kilkisiakos and Kassandra.

References

External links
 

1969 births
Living people
Sportspeople from Kragujevac
Yugoslav footballers
Serbia and Montenegro footballers
Serbian footballers
Association football forwards
FK Spartak Subotica players
FK Rad players
Athinaikos F.C. players
Trikala F.C. players
ILTEX Lykoi F.C. players
Kavala F.C. players
Kassandra F.C. players
Yugoslav First League players
Super League Greece players
Serbia and Montenegro expatriate footballers
Expatriate footballers in Greece
Serbia and Montenegro expatriate sportspeople in Greece